Mutanga is a surname. Notable people with the surname include:

Gédéon Kyungu Mutanga, Congolese militia leader
Tinashe Mutanga (born 1993), Zimbabwean sprinter

Surnames of African origin